Jabbi Shah Dilawar is a village and union council, an administrative subdivision, of Chakwal District in the Punjab Province of Pakistan, it is part of Talagang Tehsil Jabbi Shah Dilawar Postal Code is 48020, It contain two Govt. and two private school, more than 10 Mosque in Jabbi Shah Dilawar, Its population is more than 10,000 including urban (Dhoke) and is located at 33°5'36N 71°59'29E.

References

Union councils of Chakwal District
Populated places in Chakwal District